RAF Rhine was the name of the Royal Flying Corps command that comprised units posted to Germany in 1918 as part of the occupying forces following World War I. The RAF presence in Germany was wound down to a single squadron (No. 12 Squadron RAF) and RAF Rhine was disbanded on 2 October 1919. After RAF Rhine disbanded the remaining units were directly under command of the Army of Occupation. RAF Rhine continued to be listed in AFL until at least Jul 1922.

Its headquarters were at Bickendorf, Germany.

Commanders:
4 Jan 1919             Maj-Gen Sir John Higgins known as Jack Higgins (RAF officer)
7 May 1919             Maj-Gen Sir John Salmond

See also

 List of Royal Air Force commands

References

External links
RAFWeb

Royal Air Force commands